Cognasse is a 1932 French comedy film directed by Louis Mercanton and starring Tramel, Thérèse Dorny and Marguerite Moreno. The film was made at the Joinville Studios by the French subsidiary of Paramount Pictures.

Cast
 Tramel as Cognasse  
 Thérèse Dorny as Mme. Cognasse  
 Marguerite Moreno as Nurse  
 André Roanne as Paul Fargeot  
 Christiane Tourneur as Ginette Cognasse  
 Gaston Mauger as Mingret  
 Marcelle Monthil 
  Christiane Delyne 
 Germaine Michel 
 Yvonne Ducos 
 Josèphe Evelys
 Micheline Bernard 
 Pierre Moreno 
 Maurice Rémy 
 Jean Rozenberg 
 Paul Faivre 
 Georgé 
 Jean Mercanton 
 Henri Jullien 
 Eugène Stuber
 Georges Rip
 Robert Bossis 
 Robert Darthez

References

Bibliography 
 Crisp, Colin. Genre, Myth and Convention in the French Cinema, 1929-1939. Indiana University Press, 2002.

External links 
 

1932 comedy films
French comedy films
1932 films
1930s French-language films
Films directed by Louis Mercanton
Films shot at Joinville Studios
French black-and-white films
1930s French films